Aleksandr Aleksandrovich Prudnikov (born 24 February 1989) is a Russian former footballer who played as a forward.

Career

Club
On 8 April 2007, he made his debut for Spartak first team, scoring a winning goal in the game against Luch Vladivostok.

On 22 April 2007, Chelsea FC sporting director Frank Arnesen while visiting Moscow told the Russian sports newspaper Sovietskiy sport after the match against FC Krylya Sovetov Samara, that he liked the way Prudnikov performed in the game. FC Spartak Moscow sold on loan the striker, already with Russia's national team moves to FC Terek Grozny.

On 15 July 2009, Prudnikov agreed to join Czech giants Sparta Prague on a one-year-long loan deal. However, the contract was terminated after half a year.

On 31 March 2010, Prudnikov was loaned to FC Tom Tomsk.

As of 21 June 2013, it was confirmed that Prudnikov was on trial with  FC Rubin Kazan in order to try and win a contract. He travelled with the club to their pre-season tour of Austria and started up front in a pre-season friendly against FC Steaua București on 22 June 2013. He signed for the club not long after, and scored on his debut away to FK Jagodina in the UEFA Europa League.

On 16 July 2014, FC Dynamo Moscow announced signing Prudnikov on a 1-year deal.

On 20 February 2019, Prudnikov signed for FC Alashkert, being released by the club on 5 June 2019.

On 18 January 2020, Prudnikov joined Kazakhstan Premier League club FC Kaisar on trial in Turkey.

International
Prudnikov was one of the stars of the Russian U-17 squad that won the 2006 UEFA U-17 Championship. He was a part of the Russia U-21 side that was competing in the 2011 European Under-21 Championship qualification.

Career statistics

Notes

References

External links 
 
 Aleksandr Prudnikov's profile on Spartak Moscow website.
 Aleksandr Prudnikov's website
 
 

1989 births
Sportspeople from Smolensk
Living people
Russian footballers
Association football forwards
Russia youth international footballers
Russia under-21 international footballers
Russia national football B team footballers
Russian expatriate footballers
Expatriate footballers in the Czech Republic
Expatriate footballers in Latvia
Expatriate footballers in Armenia
Expatriate footballers in Belarus
FC Spartak Moscow players
Russian Premier League players
FC Akhmat Grozny players
AC Sparta Prague players
Czech First League players
FC Tom Tomsk players
FC Anzhi Makhachkala players
FC Kuban Krasnodar players
FC Spartak Vladikavkaz players
FC Rubin Kazan players
FC Dynamo Moscow players
FC Amkar Perm players
FC Orenburg players
FK Spartaks Jūrmala players
FC Alashkert players
FC Vitebsk players